Danijel Romić (born 19 March 1993) is a Croatian football player who plays for Austrian club FC Purkersdorf.

Club career
On 8 February 2023, Romić joined FC Purkersdorf in Austrian lower leagues.

Club statistics

Updated to games played as of 15 May 2021.

References

External links
 HLSZ 
 MLSZ 
 

1993 births
Sportspeople from Subotica
Croats of Vojvodina
Living people
Association football central defenders
Croatian footballers
Kozármisleny SE footballers
Pécsi MFC players
Vasas SC players
Hapoel Katamon Jerusalem F.C. players
HNK Cibalia players
Soroksár SC players
Budafoki LC footballers
Szombathelyi Haladás footballers
Nemzeti Bajnokság I players
Nemzeti Bajnokság II players
Liga Leumit players
Croatian Football League players
Croatian expatriate footballers
Expatriate footballers in Hungary
Croatian expatriate sportspeople in Hungary
Expatriate footballers in Israel
Croatian expatriate sportspeople in Israel
Expatriate footballers in Austria
Croatian expatriate sportspeople in Austria